William Dowall (30 April 1907 – 1972) was a Scottish footballer who played in several positions, though mainly centre forward or right back. He made over 100 Scottish Football League appearances for Motherwell during the early 1930s, the most successful period in their history in which they won the league title in 1931–32 and finished in the top three places in the two years either side of that triumph. Motherwell also reached two Scottish Cup finals (1931 and 1933, losing both) but Dowall did not play in either, with injuries interrupting his progress to an extent, as well as his ability to play in several roles which meant he was moved around to accommodate the team's needs but never became fully established in one position.

After a loan spell with St Mirren, Dowall left Scottish football in 1935 and joined Bury, later moving to Lincoln City. He then spent a season in France with Red Star Paris and one in Northern Ireland with Ballymena United, switching back to England with Notts County shortly before the outbreak of World War II.

References

1907 births
1972 deaths
People from Thornliebank
Sportspeople from East Renfrewshire
Association football forwards
Association football defenders
Association football utility players
Scottish footballers
Scottish expatriate footballers
Motherwell F.C. players
Red Star F.C. players
Scottish Football League players
Scottish Junior Football Association players
NIFL Premiership players
Ligue 1 players
Expatriate footballers in France
English Football League players
Kilbirnie Ladeside F.C. players
St Mirren F.C. players
Bury F.C. players
Lincoln City F.C. players
Notts County F.C. players
Scottish expatriate sportspeople in France
Ballymena United F.C. players